The Battle of Ctesiphon in 165 AD was part of the wider Roman-Parthian Wars. The Parthians had tried but failed to take Armenia in the previous years, but a Roman counter-attack saw them lay a successful siege and capture of Ctesiphon.

Aftermath

Like the previous invasion attempts, the Romans made no attempt at permanently occupying Ctesiphon. In the end, the Parthians managed to re-group. However, the Parthians were becoming steadily weaker, with more concessions given to the Roman Empire and the Parthian nobles and vassal kingdoms.

Ctesiphon 165
Ctesiphon
Ctesiphon
165
160s in the Roman Empire
Sieges of Ctesiphon